Benjamin Helm (born 8 May 1964) is a British rower. He competed in the men's lightweight coxless four event at the 1996 Summer Olympics.

References

External links
 

1964 births
Living people
British male rowers
Olympic rowers of Great Britain
Rowers at the 1996 Summer Olympics
Rowers from Greater London